The University of Zimbabwe Lake Kariba Research Station is a research station in the Nyamhunga suburb of Kariba. It is operated by the University of Zimbabwe. Station staff have published research on topics such as fish diets  and population dynamics  and climate change.

References

Research stations
Research institutes in Zimbabwe
University of Zimbabwe
Buildings and structures in Mashonaland West Province